Zru'a (lit. Sown) is a religious moshav in southern Israel. Located near Netivot and the Gaza Strip, it falls under the jurisdiction of Sdot Negev Regional Council.

History
The village was established in 1953 by immigrants from Morocco. Its name is taken from the Book of Jeremiah 2:2;
Go, and cry in the ears of Jerusalem, saying: Thus saith the LORD: I remember for thee the affection of thy youth, the love of thine espousals; how thou wentest after Me in the wilderness, in a land that was not sown.

References

External links
Zru'a Negev Information Centre

Moshavim
Religious Israeli communities
Populated places established in 1953
Populated places in Southern District (Israel)
1953 establishments in Israel
Moroccan-Jewish culture in Israel